The University of Utah Hospital is a research and teaching hospital on the campus of the University of Utah in Salt Lake City, Utah. It serves as a major regional referral center for Utah and the surrounding states of Idaho, Nevada, Wyoming, Montana and New Mexico. University of Utah Health Care is praised for the following specialties: cardiology, geriatrics, gynecology, pediatrics, rheumatology, pulmonology, neurology, oncology, orthopedics, and ophthalmology.

History
University of Utah Hospital opened its doors in 1965, coinciding with the closing of Salt Lake County General Hospital, which had served as the main teaching hospital for the University of Utah School of Medicine since 1942.

In 1982, Barney Clark received the world's first permanently implanted artificial heart, the Jarvik-7, during an operation performed by William C. DeVries, M.D.

In September 1981, an expansion to the old building was dedicated.

In 2001 the hospital was named as the Intermountain West's first nationally certified Level 1 Trauma Center by the American College of Surgeons.

In 2007 the George S. and Dolores Dore Eccles Critical Care Pavilion, an addition to the hospital was opened. A new $200-million patient care pavilion, with space for an additional 100 private patient rooms, was dedicated in July 2009.

Mario R. Capecchi, Ph.D. won the 2007 Nobel Prize in Physiology or Medicine as a University of Utah gene targeting pioneer.

In July 2017, the hospital was part of an incident where the police detective Jeff Payne wrongfully arrested nurse Alex Wubbels. Payne asked Wubbels to provide a blood sample from an unconscious patient, and she was arrested when she refused. Wubbels was later released and no charges were brought against her. In September 2017, after footage of the incident went viral, the hospital announced changes to the hospital protocol meant to stop a similar incident from happening in the future. Under this new protocol, police officers will not be allowed in patient-care areas and will speak with "house supervisors" instead of nurses.

Medical campus

The University of Utah Health Sciences medical campus houses the School of Medicine, Intermountain Burn Unit, Huntsman Cancer Institute, Moran Eye Center, University Orthopaedic Center, Huntsman Mental Health Institute, and Primary Children's Hospital, one of only two children's hospitals in Utah. Primary Children's Hospital, though linked to the University of Utah Health Care is owned and operated by Intermountain Health Care.

As part of that system, University Hospitals & Clinics relies on more than 1,100 board-certified physicians, 10 community clinics, and several specialty centers, including the Cardiovascular Center, the Clinical Neurosciences Center, and the Utah Diabetes Center.

Organization
The Hospitals and Clinics are administered under the direction of the Community Board of Directors, which is under the authority of the University of Utah's board of trustees. The CEO of University of Utah Health is also the Senior Vice President of Health Sciences and reports to the president of the University of Utah.

References

External links
Official website

Hospital buildings completed in 1965
University of Utah
Teaching hospitals in Utah
Hospitals in Salt Lake City
1965 establishments in Utah
Trauma centers